Li Jianbo (李建波; born November 14, 1986 in Qujing, Yunnan) is a male Chinese race walker. He finished thirteenth in the 50 km race walk event at the 2008 Summer Olympics and sixth at the 2012 Summer Olympics.

Achievements

See also 
China at the 2012 Summer Olympics - Athletics
Athletics at the 2012 Summer Olympics – Men's 50 kilometres walk

References

Team China 2008

1986 births
Living people
Athletes (track and field) at the 2008 Summer Olympics
Athletes (track and field) at the 2012 Summer Olympics
Chinese male racewalkers
Olympic athletes of China
People from Qujing
Athletes from Yunnan